Benjamin Grant (born 15 April 1970) is a Sierra Leonean hurdler. He competed in the men's 4 × 100 metres relay at the 1988 Summer Olympics.

References

External links
 

1970 births
Living people
Athletes (track and field) at the 1988 Summer Olympics
Athletes (track and field) at the 1992 Summer Olympics
Sierra Leonean male sprinters
Sierra Leonean male hurdlers
Olympic athletes of Sierra Leone
Place of birth missing (living people)
Universiade medalists for Sierra Leone
Universiade medalists in athletics (track and field)
Medalists at the 1991 Summer Universiade